Eric Walter "Fritzy" Freeman  (13 July 1944 – 14 December 2020) was an Australian cricketer who played in 11 Test matches from 1968 to 1970. He was also a leading Australian rules footballer with Port Adelaide Football Club, playing 116 games between 1964 and 1972, kicking 390 goals, and playing in their 1965 premiership team.

Life
Born in Semaphore, South Australia, Freeman played cricket for South Australia from 1964–65 to 1973–74. He toured with Australian teams to New Zealand in 1966–67, England in 1968, and India and South Africa in 1969–70. His only first-class century was 116 for the Australians against Northamptonshire in 1968, scored in 90 minutes with five sixes and 13 fours. His best bowling figures were 8 for 47 for South Australia against the New Zealand team in 1967–68 (11 for 97 in the match).

Freeman was the first batsman in test history to get off the mark in his test career by scoring a six.

Following his retirement from playing, Freeman was a commentator and statistician on cricket and football for ABC Radio in Adelaide until his retirement in 2010.

In the 2002 Queen's Birthday Honours Freeman was awarded the Medal of the Order of Australia for "service to sport, particularly cricket as a player, administrator and commentator".

References

External links
 

1944 births
Australia Test cricketers
South Australia cricketers
Port Adelaide Football Club (SANFL) players
Port Adelaide Football Club players (all competitions)
Australian rules footballers from South Australia
Australian cricketers
Cricketers from Adelaide
Recipients of the Medal of the Order of Australia
2020 deaths